Final standings of the Hungarian League 1929–30 season

Final standings

Results

External links
 IFFHS link

Nemzeti Bajnokság I seasons
Hun
1929–30 in Hungarian football